Braddock is a surname. Notable people with the surname include:

 Andrew Braddock, Australian politician, Greens
 Bessie Braddock, British politician
 Bobby Braddock, country music songwriter
 Christine Braddock, a British further education administrator and academic
 Edward Braddock, British army general in colonial America
 James Braddock (cricketer), English cricketer
 James J. Braddock, American boxer also known as "Cinderella Man"
 Jeremy Braddock, a former band member of 100 Demons
 Paige Braddock, American cartoonist best known for her Eisner-nominated comic strip Jane's World
 Scott Braddock, retired American professional wrestler
 Thomas Braddock (priest) (1556–1607), Anglican clergyman and author
 Tom Braddock (1887–1976), British politician
 Zach Braddock, a former professional baseball pitcher
 Brad Bradley, American professional wrestler who wrestled for the WWE as Ryan Braddock, previously known as Jay Bradley
 Michael Depoli, American professional wrestler who wrestled for the WWE as Tony Braddock, previously known as Roadkill

Fictional characters:
 Benjamin Braddock, protagonist of the 1967 movie The Graduate
 Col. James Braddock, main character of Missing in Action (film)
 Captain John Braddock, the police captain protagonist of TV's Racket Squad, played by Reed Hadley.
 Matt Braddock, fictional bomber pilot
Marvel Comics Universe
 Brian Braddock, formerly known as Captain Britain and currently as Captain Avalon. Brother of Betsy and Jamie.
 Elizabeth "Betsy" Braddock, formerly known as Psylocke and currently as Captain Britain. Sister of Brian and Jamie.
 Jamie Braddock, also known as Monarch. Brother of Brian and Betsy.
Jackson Braddock, a character in Desperate Housewives, played by Gale Harold.
 Scott "Scotty" Braddock was a major character in the film Jeepers Creepers 2

See also
 Braddock (disambiguation)